Flower is the debut extended play by South Korean singer Yong Jun-hyung, member and rapper of South Korean boy group Beast. The EP was released on December 13, 2013, by Cube Entertainment and consists of five tracks including the title track of the same name, "Flower".

Track listing

References

External links
 Official website

2013 debut EPs
Korean-language EPs
Cube Entertainment EPs